Valentin Borisovich Yumashev (born 15 December 1957) is a Russian journalist, politician and businessman-developer, who is the son-in-law of former President Boris Yeltsin and a member of his inner circle. 

He was Editor-in-Chief of Ogonyok from 1995 to 1996. In 1996, he was appointed adviser to President Boris Yeltsin for public relations. In March 1997, Yumashev succeeded Anatoly Chubais in the powerful position of the Chairman of the Presidential Executive Office. In December 1998, he was dismissed from that position. He now works in real estate development.

Biography 
Valentin Yumashev was born 15 December, 1957 in Perm. His family moved to the Moscow region when he was sixteen. 

He entered the Faculty of Journalism of the Moscow State University but did not finish his studies. In 1976, he started working as a courier at the Komsomolskaya Pravda newspaper. A year later, Yumashev was drafted into the army.

In 1996, Yumashev was appointed advisor to the president on interaction with the mass media. 

In 1997-1998, he served as head of the presidential administration, succeeding Anatoly Chubais.

In 1999, Yumashev allegedly initiated the appointment of Vladimir Putin as prime minister of the Russian Federation.

News of Yumashev's resignation, in April 2022, from an unpaid post as adviser to Vladimir Putin, became widely known at the end of May 2022.

Family
From his first marriage with Irina Vedeneyeva, he has a daughter, Polina. In 2001, Polina married Oleg Deripaska.

Yumashev and his second wife Tatyana Yumasheva (daughter of the first president of Russia Boris Yeltsin) own half of the Imperia Tower in "Moscow International Business Center" and half of the business center of "CITY" (49.58% of shares).

It was reported that he, along with his wife and their daughter, have been citizens of Austria since 2009.

References

External links

Living people
1957 births
1st class Active State Councillors of the Russian Federation
Politicians from Perm, Russia
Russian journalists
Kremlin Chiefs of Staff
Writers from Perm, Russia
Naturalised citizens of Austria
Family of Boris Yeltsin
Russian activists against the 2022 Russian invasion of Ukraine
Businesspeople from Perm, Russia